Al-Jafr is a city in the Ma'an Governorate of Jordan.

It was the site of an April Fools' Day hoax in 2010 that has drawn comparisons to the famous American The War of the Worlds broadcast. The nearby desert area has also been used for high speed performance tests by teams attempting to break the Land speed record.

See also
Al Jafr prison

References

3. Jordan shooting: Three US military trainers killed at al-Jafr air base : 4 November 2016.

Populated places in Ma'an Governorate